Rayakottai railway station is a train station serving the town of Hosur in Krishnagiri district of Tamil Nadu. The station falls on the Salem–Bangalore line and is the closest railway link for the town of Krishnagiri, a district headquarters in Tamil Nadu.

References

External links

Bangalore railway division
Railway stations in Krishnagiri district